Kamal El Sheikh (2 February 1919 – 2 January 2004) was an Egyptian film director. He directed 28 films between 1952 and 1987, with eight of them in the Top 100 Egyptian films list. He was known in the fifties and early sixties as "Hitchcock of Egypt" because of his influence on the cinema of the well-known British director.

Selected filmography
 Malak al-Rahma (1946 - editor)
 Al-Manzel Raqam 13 (1952)
 Hob wa Dumoo` (1955)
 Life or Death (1955)
 Ard al-Salam (1957)
 Sayyidat al-Qasr (1958)
 Hobbi al-Wahid (1960)
 Lan Aataref (1961)
 Chased by the Dogs (1962)
 Last Night (1964)
Three Thieves (Story 3) (1966)
The Man who lost his Shadow (1968)
Sunset and Sunrise (1970)
Whom Should We Shoot? (1975)
The Peacock (1982)

References

External links

1919 births
2004 deaths
Egyptian film directors